Sulglicotide (or sulglycotide) is a drug used for peptic ulcer and gastro-oesophageal reflux disease.

References

Drugs acting on the gastrointestinal system and metabolism